Frank-Michael Marczewski (born 30 April 1954) is a German former professional footballer who played as a defender.

Marczewski made 202 appearances over a decade in the 2. Bundesliga during his playing career.

References

External links
 

1954 births
Living people
German footballers
Association football defenders
2. Bundesliga players
FC Augsburg players
OSC Bremerhaven players
Tennis Borussia Berlin players
Footballers from Berlin